Cleveland Avenue may refer to:

 A section of Ohio State Route 3 in Columbus, Ohio
 Cleveland Avenue station, a light rail station in Gresham, Oregon

See also

Cleveland Street (disambiguation)
Cleveland (disambiguation)